The Nik Collection is a suite of photo editing plugins intended for use with a host application, such as Adobe Lightroom, Affinity Photo or DxO PhotoLab.

History
Nik Sharpener and Nik Color Efex were developed by Nik Multimedia Inc. in the 1990s as digital photo filters that could be used in Photoshop or as standalone applications. Some years later, in 2003, Dfine 1.0, a denoising application and plugin was added to the list of products on offer. 

The newly rebranded Nik Software company then added Viveza and Silver Efex to the offer in 2008, and subsequently bundled all of their award-winning photo editing plugin applications, Dfine 2.0, Viveza, Color Efex Pro 3.0, Silver Efex Pro and Sharpener Pro 3.0 together in a single Collection. The Complete Collection Ultimate Edition sold for $599.95 USD and the Complete Collection for Lightroom and Aperture for $299.95 USD. HDR EFex was added to the collection in 2010.

After acquisition, Google relaunched the collection of six applications, with the new Analog Efex, in 2013 as the Google Nik Collection and reduced its price to $150  and then, in 2016, made it completely free to use. 

In 2017 Google sold the, now seven-application, collection to DxO Labs for an undisclosed amount. DxO Labs have since added and eighth application: Perspective Efex.

References

Lightroom
Photo software
Raster graphics editors
Image processing software